Kaan, or Libo, is an Adamawa language of Nigeria.

References

Languages of Nigeria
Bambukic languages